The Memphis Grizzlies Radio Network is the regionally delivered sports network featuring game coverage of the National Basketball Association franchise Memphis Grizzlies. The network is a joint venture between the franchise and Skyview Networks.

The network has broadcast Memphis Grizzlies basketball since the team relocated to Memphis from Vancouver, British Columbia (Canada) in 2001.

Affiliates

Tennessee

Kentucky

Arkansas

Missouri

Mississippi

References

External links
 Memphis Grizzlies official website
 WMFS

 

Radio stations in Memphis, Tennessee
Memphis Grizzlies
Sports radio networks in the United States
National Basketball Association on the radio